Celypha argyrata is a moth of the family Tortricidae. It is found in Vietnam.

The wingspan is about 11 mm. The ground colour of the forewings is pale brownish grey with blackish-brown spots and longitudinal lines along the median area and postmedially. The posterior third of the wing is white silver with suffusions and weak marks. The hindwings are pale brown.

Etymology
The name refers to colouration of distal third of forewing and is derived from Latin argyrata (meaning tinged with silver).

References

Moths described in 2009
Olethreutini
Moths of Asia
Taxa named by Józef Razowski